Chrysochlamys is a plant genus of the family Clusiaceae.

Synonymy
The monotypic genus Balboa Planch. & Triana has been put in synonymy with Chrysochlamys.

Species
Species include:

Clusiaceae
Malpighiales genera
Taxa named by Eduard Friedrich Poeppig